Larger Than Life is the second studio album by American singer Jody Watley, released by MCA Records on March 27, 1989.

Reception
"André Cymone remains as slickly up to the minute as ever," observed Qs Mark Cooper, "filling his enormous rhythm sound with hip-hop references… Occasionally Watley lets the pose slip and slips into a passively sensuous ballad like 'Everything', but mostly she keeps acting stroppy. Perhaps she's annoyed at the lack of any tune to match that first hit; more likely she thinks looking angry makes her sexy."

Track listingCD bonus track – Track 13. "Real Love" (Extended Version)

 Personnel 
 Jody Watley – lead vocals, backing vocals
 André Cymone – all other instruments
 Todd Horriman – Fairlight programming
 Gardner Cole – keyboards (3)
 Jai Winding – acoustic piano (12)
 Dean Parks – acoustic guitar (3, 8, 12), electric guitar (3, 8, 12)
 John Robinson – drums (8, 12)
 Paulinho da Costa – percussion (3, 8, 9)
 Larry Williams – saxophone (3, 9)
 Eric B. – turntablism (2)
 Rakim – rap (2)
 Bernadette Anderson – spoken voice (4)
 Maria Gallagher – Spanish translation (8)

 Production 
 André Cymone – producer, overdub recording 
 Jeff Lorber – additional production (13)
 Bobby Brooks – engineer (1-12)
 Dan Marnien – engineer (1-12)
 Jeff Poe – engineer (1-12), assistant engineer (1-12)
 David Bianco – engineer (13)
 Lawrence Fried – assistant engineer (1-12)
 Dave "the Blade" Knight – assistant engineer (1-12)
 Andy Batwinas – assistant engineer (13)
 Brian Malouf – mixing (1-12)
 Louis Silas Jr. – remixing (13)
 Greg Royal – special edits (13)
 Steve Hall – mastering at Future Disc Systems (Hollywood, California)
 Ivy Skoff – production assistant 
 Lynn Robb – art direction, design 
 Jody Watley – cover art concept, wardrobe stylist
 Steven Meisel – photography
 Mac James – portrait oil painting, portrait photography 
 Paul Cavaco – wardrobe stylist
 Oribe – hair stylist 
 Francois Nars – make-up

Tour
Following the success of her Billboard chart hit pop singles, "Real Love" and "Friends", Watley embarked on her first USA solo tour, the Larger than Life Tour to support the platinum selling album. Setlist: Jody WatleySetlist"What 'Cha Gonna Do for Me"
"Don't You Want Me"
"Still a Thrill"
"L.O.V.E.R."
"For Love's Sake"
"Most of All"
"Everything"
"Precious Love"
"Some Kind of Lover"
"Friends"
"Looking for a New Love"
"Real Love"Shows'

Charts

Weekly charts

Year-end charts

Singles

Certifications

References

External links

Jody Watley albums
1989 albums
MCA Records albums
Albums produced by André Cymone